Riccardo Fiamozzi (born 18 May 1993) is an Italian professional footballer who plays as a full back or midfielder for  club Reggiana.

Club career

Varese
Born in Trento, Trentino, Fiamozzi started his playing career at Varese. After Varese failed to win promotion to Serie A, Torino signed Fiamozzi in June 2012 for €370,000 and sold striker Osarimen Ebagua back to Varese for €470,000. He was immediately loaned back to Varese by Torino for the 2012–13 Serie B season. That year, he made his first team debut for Varese, playing in the Coppa Italia, as well as making 14 appearances for the senior team during the season.

In June 2013, Varese bought back Fiamozzi in a co-ownership deal from Torino. He scored his first goal in Serie B during Varese-Pescara, 3–2. On 21 June 2014, Torino's 50% share of Fiamozzi was redeemed by Varese.

Lecce
On 25 July 2018, Fiamozzi signed a three-year contract with Serie B side Lecce.

Empoli
On 10 January 2020 he was loaned to Empoli for a two-year term with a purchase option.

Reggiana
On 17 January 2023, Fiamozzi joined Serie C club Reggiana.

International career
Fiamozzi played all 6 games in 2012 UEFA European Under-19 Football Championship qualification and elite qualification. He wore the number 9 shirt, playing the first game as a substitute of Gianluca Caprari. He then became a starting player in round 2 and 3, before substituting Elio De Silvestro, Massimiliano Busellato and Mattia Valoti in the Elite round respectively.

References

External links
 Lega Serie B profile 
 FIGC 
 

1993 births
Living people
Italian footballers
Italy youth international footballers
S.S.D. Varese Calcio players
Delfino Pescara 1936 players
Genoa C.F.C. players
Frosinone Calcio players
S.S.C. Bari players
U.S. Lecce players
Empoli F.C. players
A.C. Reggiana 1919 players
Serie A players
Serie B players
Association football defenders
Sportspeople from Trento
Footballers from Trentino-Alto Adige/Südtirol